In a Dark Place is a 2006 horror film version of Henry James' 1898 novella The Turn of the Screw.

Plot summary
Anna Veigh is an art teacher that seems to get too involved in her students' private lives. She is called into the headmaster's office and chastised for (once again) attempting to be an "art therapist" rather than an art teacher. The headmaster makes inappropriate advances, touching her leg and putting his arm around her as he informs her that she is on "the wrong track". Later, the headmaster calls and leaves a message on her answering machine in which it is revealed that she has been fired and something has occurred in the office that he wishes to "keep secret". He informs her that he has found her a job as a nanny that pays very well.

The next day, she attends an interview for the job and is hired on the spot by the wealthy and mysterious Mr. Laing to become the nanny for his niece and nephew — two wealthy young orphans — whilst he is away on business. It seems a perfect escape for her, a welcome change.

Her new workplace is Bly House, a remote country estate with beautiful grounds and a small resident staff. Miles and Flora, the children, seem sweet and charming, if a little strange, and Anna thinks that she has really "landed on her feet" after the rigors of her previous job. The only fly in the ointment is the frosty estate manager, Miss Grose, who seems remote and unfriendly to the new arrival.

Anna soon begins to make disquieting discoveries. Miles, the boy, has been expelled from his school, for a sin so dreadful the headmaster will not even discuss it. Anna hears whispers through the night often leading towards Flora's bedroom. Anna then learns that her predecessor in the job, one Miss Jessel, drowned in a lake on the property. Her lover, Mr. Quint, hanged himself in Bly House shortly thereafter. The children continue to commit devilish seeming acts, that lead her to question the children. To add to her unease, Anna begins to catch glimpses of unknown sinister figures lurking in the grounds, but nobody else admits to seeing them.

Anna confronts Miss Grose with her suspicions about the intruders and is surprised to learn that Miss Grose had hated Mr. Quint for stealing her lesbian lover, Miss Jessel. The figures Anna describes are unmistakably Miss Jessel and Mr. Quint, but these former employees have been dead for some time. Anna has recurring daydreams concerning her own abuse as a child, and she soon suspects that Mr. Quint and Miss Jessel may have physically abused Miles and Flora as well.

As Anna's ghost sightings and fears for the children's safety become more pronounced, Miss Grose begins to doubt Anna's sanity and fires her from her post. As Anna reveals some affection for the estate manager, Miss Grose reconsiders and begins to passionately kiss Anna. While they later sleep together that evening, it is apparent on Anna's face that she is shocked by the estate manager's physical attention and feels that she is again being abused just as when she was a child.  It seems as if Anna is being sexually abused by every character in the movie, highlighting her disturbing childhood.

Eventually, the children grow more and more fearful and sullen around Anna. Anna's hallucinations about having multiple threesomes and foursomes, and therefore her emotional breakdown continues, and Miss Grose once again tells her to leave. Anna frequently visits the lake that Miss Jessel had supposedly drowned in, yet tells the children not to go there.  She seems possessed and has frequent sightings of Miss Jessel there. After some strange behaviour on the children's part and Anna's, it is unclear what exactly is going on.  That evening, Flora has a severe fear-induced asthma attack and is taken away by ambulance, never to be seen again. Miles runs away, and before accompanying Flora to the hospital, Miss Grose makes Anna promise to call her as soon as Miles is found.

Anna finds and chases the frightened Miles around the estate believing that only she can rescue him from the ghosts' attentions. As she corners him at the lake where Miss Jessel drowned, Miles in a sense "walks the plank", slowly forcing himself into the water and drops from the log into the shallow creek-like puddle where Miss Jessel's previous body parts had been shown. There is no struggle and he drowns. Anna tells him that he will now be free of his suffering and that what happened between them will remain a secret. It is suggested that Anna had been physically abusing Miles and Flora just as she had been abused as a child herself, but the truth is no one really knows, if she is insane and imagining these images or being harassed by ghostly figures.  Then without any real explanation or even implication, her face suddenly turns into herself as a little girl and says "I'm the only one."  The viewer is left questioning if her mind was in fact the "dark place" or if in fact the house was truly haunted.

Cast
Leelee Sobieski as Anna Veigh
Tara Fitzgerald as Miss Grose
Christian Olson as Miles
Gabrielle Adam as Flora
Graham Pountney as Mr. James
Jonathan Fox as Mr. Laing
Thomas Sanne as Headmaster
Patrick Dechesne as Quint
Gintare Parulyte as Miss Jessel 
Cleo Rotunno as Small girl (young Anna)

Notes

External links
 
 

2006 horror films
2000s English-language films
English-language Luxembourgian films
Luxembourgian horror films
British horror thriller films
British supernatural thriller films
LGBT-related horror thriller films
British supernatural horror films
2000s psychological horror films
Films about child sexual abuse
British LGBT-related films
Luxembourgian LGBT-related films
Films based on The Turn of the Screw
Films set in country houses
2006 LGBT-related films
2006 films
2000s British films